John Wiles (20 September 1925 – 5 April 1999) was a South African novelist, television writer and producer. He was the second producer of the science fiction series Doctor Who, succeeding Verity Lambert, and credited on four serials between 1965 and 1966, namely The Myth Makers, The Daleks' Master Plan (which lasted for twelve episodes), The Massacre of St Bartholomew's Eve, and The Ark.

Producer of Doctor Who
Although he had a good working relationship with story editor Donald Tosh, Wiles found that he was unable to make many changes to the format of the programme. Attempts to make the series darker led to clashes with actor William Hartnell who, as the sole remaining member of the original team, saw himself as the guardian of the series' original values. An attempt to give new companion Dodo Chaplet a cockney accent was vetoed by Wiles' superiors, who ordered that the regulars must speak "BBC English". With Hartnell increasingly in poor health and hostile to Wiles, the latter sought a way to replace the actor. However, this was again opposed by Wiles' superiors. Wiles also disliked the lengthy The Daleks' Master Plan story which had been commissioned by the previous production team and which proved difficult to realise. One of his few changes that lasted even a short time was to limit nearly all stories to just four episodes.

In early 1966, Wiles resigned in frustration over an inability to steer the show in the direction he wanted. Tosh resigned in sympathy. Of the episodes from his tenure, only the four episode serial The Ark, and three episodes from The Daleks' Master Plan, still survive in the BBC's archives. As Wiles chose not to employ John Cura and his Tele-snaps service, only a few clips (sourced from both low-quality 8mm and higher quality 16mm film recordings), publicity photographs and behind the scenes stills give a visual record of his work on the series.

After Doctor Who
After leaving Doctor Who, Wiles wrote two stories for the science-fiction anthology series Out of the Unknown. These were Taste of Evil and The Man in My Head, both broadcast as part of its fourth and final season in 1971. Although Taste of Evil was, like most of his work on Doctor Who, wiped and only still photographs are known to exist, The Man in My Head survived as its original videotape master and is available on the series DVD set.

Wiles also wrote several plays including Act of Hardness, Family on Trial and A Lesson in Blood and Roses, which was performed by the Royal Shakespeare Company (RSC). Wiles died on 5 April 1999 at the age of 73.

References

External links
 

1925 births
1999 deaths
South African screenwriters
20th-century South African male writers
BBC television producers
South African television writers
South African male writers
South African television producers
People from Kimberley, Northern Cape
South African emigrants to the United Kingdom
20th-century screenwriters